Exapate bicuspidella is a species of moth belonging to the family Tortricidae.

It is native to Finland.

References

Tortricidae
Moths described in 1996